Thorellina is a genus of southeast Asian orb-weaver spiders first described by C. Berg in 1899.  it contains only two species from Myanmar and Papua New Guinea.

References

Araneidae
Araneomorphae genera
Spiders of Asia